Vitaly Ivanovich Vorotnikov (20 January 1926 – 19 February 2012) was a Soviet politician and diplomat who was the Chairman of the Presidium of the Supreme Soviet of the Russian SFSR between 1988 and 1990.

Early life and education
Vorotnikov was born in Voronezh, and in 1940 entered a local Aviation Industry community college, majoring in aircraft engine technology. After the Soviet Union entered World War II and adult workers left for the Red Army service, 16-year-old Vitaly took a job at the Voronezh Steam Locomotive Repair plant. Soon the front line approached the city, and he was evacuated to Kuybyshev, where he spent most of the war working for Kuibyshev aviation plant No. 18 and studying at Kuybyshev Aviation Technology School.

Career
After graduation, Vorotnikov kept working at the plant after the war in both managerial and Communist Party organizing positions. At the same time he was taking evening classes at the Kuybyshev Aviation Institute, finally earning his engineering degree in 1954.

From the position of the chairman of the Communist Party committee at his plant (1950–1960) Vorotnikov advanced to a position of responsibility in the Kuybyshev Oblast Part Committee (1960). After occupying a number of positions of regional importance in Russia's Kuybyshev and Voronezh Oblasts for almost 20 years, he served as the Soviet ambassador to Cuba from 1979 to 1982. In fact, he was exiled by Brezhnev to this post.

After being recalled from Cuba when Brezhnev died and a short stint in charge of the Communists of Krasnodar Krai, Vorotnikov was finally brought to Moscow, where he was to occupy the top positions in the government of the RSFSR. He became a candidate member of the Politburo and soon a full member. From 1983 to 1988 he was the Chairman of the Council of Ministers of the RSFSR, and from 1988 to 1990 Chairman of the Presidium of the Supreme Soviet of the Russian SFSR. During his long retirement, Vorotnikov wrote several volumes of memoirs.

Death
Vorotnikov died on 19 February 2012 at the age of 86.

Decorations and awards
 Hero of Socialist Labour (1986)
 Four Orders of Lenin (1971, 1973, 1982 and 1986)
 Order of the October Revolution
 Order of the Patriotic War, 1st class
 Order of the Red Banner of Labour, three times
 Order of the Badge of Honour
 Order of Honour
 Gold Medal of the Exhibition of Economic Achievements, three times
 Order of Solidarity (Cuba, 1982)
 Honorary Citizen of Voronezh (1996)

References

External links

1926 births
2012 deaths
People from Voronezh
Central Committee of the Communist Party of the Soviet Union members
Eighth convocation members of the Soviet of the Union
Ninth convocation members of the Soviet of the Union
Tenth convocation members of the Soviet of the Union
Eleventh convocation members of the Soviet of the Union
Politburo of the Central Committee of the Communist Party of the Soviet Union candidate members
Politburo of the Central Committee of the Communist Party of the Soviet Union members
Samara State Aerospace University alumni
Ambassadors of the Soviet Union to Cuba
Heads of government of the Russian Soviet Federative Socialist Republic
Heads of state of the Russian Soviet Federative Socialist Republic
Heroes of Socialist Labour
Recipients of the Order of Honour (Russia)
Recipients of the Order of Lenin
Recipients of the Order of the Red Banner of Labour
Russian Marxists
Soviet Marxists
Burials in Troyekurovskoye Cemetery